Heather McHugh (born August 20, 1948) is an American poet notable for the independent ranges of her aesthetic as a poet, and for her working devotion to teaching and translating literature.

Life
Heather McHugh, a poet, translator, educator and caregiver-respite provider, was born in San Diego, California, to Canadian parents.  They raised McHugh in Gloucester Point, Virginia. There, her father directed the marine biological laboratory on the York River. She began writing poetry at age five and claims to have become an expert "eavesdropper" by the age of twelve.  At the age of seventeen, she entered Harvard University.  One notable work was Hinge & Sign: Poems 1968–1993, which won the Bingham Poetry Prize of the Boston Book Review and the Pollack-Harvard Review Prize, and which was named by The New York Times Book Review a Notable Book of the Year.  Another was "Glottal Stop: Poems by Paul Celan" which, with Nikolai B. Popov, she co-translated and introduced; the book won the Griffin International Poetry Prize.

McHugh was elected a Chancellor of the Academy of American Poets in 1999.  She taught for some 40 years at American colleges and universities, including the University of Washington in Seattle; and she still takes some students through the low-residency Warren Wilson College MFA Program for Writers.

In 2009, she was awarded the MacArthur Foundation "Genius Grant" for her work. and in 2011–2012, she started the non-profit CAREGIFTED ( http://caregifted.org ) to provide respite and tribute to long-term caregivers of the severely disabled and chronically ill.  For her work there she received notice from Encore.org's Purpose Prizes.

Biography 

McHugh has published eight books of poetry, one collection of critical essays, and four books of translation. She has received numerous awards and critical recognition in all of these areas, including several Pushcart Prizes, the Griffin Prize in poetry, and many others. Her poems resist contemporary identity politics. She also rejects categorization as a confessional poet, although she studied with Robert Lowell during the time when that described his work.

Her primary education included parochial school, where she credits a nun's emphasis on grammar as an early influence. When McHugh was a student at Yorktown High School in Arlington, Virginia, a teacher advised McHugh against applying to Radcliffe, making her determined to get in. She arrived in Cambridge at age 17 and graduated with honors, receiving her B.A. from Harvard in 1970. She was a Fellow at Cummington Community for the Arts in 1970, and entered graduate school at the University of Denver in 1971, having already published a poem in The New Yorker. She began teaching there, and received an Academy of American Poets prize in 1972. After earning her M.A. in 1972, McHugh received MacDowell Colony fellowships in 1973, 1974, and 1976. In 1974, she also received her first of three National Endowment for the Arts grants in poetry. McHugh was the poet-in-residence at Stephens College in Missouri between 1974 and 1976; she worked as an associate professor of English at the State University of New York at Binghamton between 1976 and 1982.

At 29, she completed a manuscript of poems titled Dangers (1976), that was a winner of Houghton Mifflin Co.'s New Poetry Series Competition, and was published by Houghton Mifflin in 1977. After a Yaddo Colony fellowship in 1980, her second book, titled A World of Difference: Poems (1981), was published by Houghton Mifflin. McHugh was 33. During this time, she was a visiting professor at Warren Wilson College in the M.F.A. Program for Writers in North Carolina; at Columbia University in New York between 1980 and 1981; and at the University of California, Irvine in 1982. During 1987, she was the Holloway Lecturer at the University of California in Berkeley. While the top journals published her poetry, some poems were also anthologized in prestigious collections, and top critics called her observations astute and noteworthy as well as courageous.

That same year World of Difference came out, her first book of translations was published. Her poetry translation of Jean Follain's French work is titled D'après tout: Poems by Jean Follain (1981) and was published by Princeton University Press in the Lockhart Poetry in Translation series. In 1984, she became the Milliman Writer-In-Residence at the University of Washington in Seattle. The residency was initiated that same year, and McHugh filled the position until 2011 when she was appointed Pollock Professor of Creative Writing. During the 1980s, McHugh worked a great deal on translation, partly due to her alliance with her co-translator and husband at that time, who also taught at the University of Washington. Her translation work includes well-known international poets like Follain and Rilke, as well as Romanian Jewish poet of the Holocaust Paul Antschel, who wrote under the pseudonym Paul Celan.  This latter translation, entitled Glottal Stop: Poems by Paul Celan, would win the Griffin International Poetry Prize. (See reference below.)

Her skill in translating literature by Slavic writers became even more evident with the publication of Because the Sea Is Black: Poems of Blaga Dimitrova (1989) featuring the work of a Bulgarian poet and novelist. Dimitrova, one of the best-loved writers in her homeland, became the first democratically elected vice-president of her country after the fall of communism. McHugh translated Dimitrova's poems for Wesleyan Poetry in Translation (published by the Wesleyan University Press) with her husband, Nikolai Popov, a scholar whom she married in 1987. Popov, an expert in Bulgarian and knowledgeable in the German and French languages, also helped to translate Celan's poetry, which was written in German.

In 1986, McHugh received a Bellagio grant from the Rockefeller Foundation. She published two more books of poetry during the 1980s: To the Quick (1987) and Shades (1988). In the late '80s, she also participated in an art project with Tom Phillips, resulting in a collectible book WHERE ARE THEY NOW?: The Class of Forty-Seven (1990). It consists of thirty images by Phillips which are interpreted in poems by McHugh and then further modified by Phillips. One of Phillips's images, "A Humument: A Treated Victorian Novel," from the collaboration is appropriately used on the cover of McHugh's essay collection Broken English: Poetry and Partiality (1993).

In 1994, Hinge & Sign: Poems 1968–1993, a collection of 24 new poems and selected poems from her five earlier books, was published by the Wesleyan University Press. The book won both the Harvard Review/Daniel Pollock Prize in 1995 and Boston Book Review's Bingham Poetry Prize and was a finalist for the National Book Award. The New York Times Book Review chose this poetry collection as a "Notable Book of the Year." In 1996, after the book's publication, she received a Lila Wallace/Reader's Digest Writing Award.

In 1998 McHugh received the Folger Library's O.B. Hardison Prize for a poet who excels in teaching. In 1999 she was elected a Chancellor of the Academy of American Poets and received the PEN/Voelker Award. During this year, her poetry was anthologized in The New Bread Loaf Anthology of Contemporary American Poetry, alongside poets laureate like Rita Dove and Robert Pinsky, and other contemporaries like Charles Wright, Lucille Clifton, James Tate, Philip Levine, and Marilyn Hacker. McHugh also began to serve as a judge for numerous poetry competitions, including the National Poetry Series and the Laughlin Prize. She was a member of the Board of Directors for the Associated Writing Programs between 1981 and 1983. She served on the Literature Panel for the National Endowment for the Arts during 1983 and 1986. In 1991, she was the Coal-Royalty Chair at the University of Alabama. In 1992, McHugh was the Elliston Poet at the University of Cincinnati. In 1991, she was the visiting professor at the University of Iowa and, in 1994, at the University of California at Los Angeles.

She takes editing collections of younger poets seriously, and helped to select poems for Hammer and Blaze: a Gathering of Contemporary American Poets (2001), published by the University of Georgia Press, which she co-edited with Ellen Bryant Voigt. About her job guest editing Ploughshares in Spring 2001, McHugh writes, "The sheer syntactical elegance of many of these new poems suggests an instrumental refinement for which I'm grateful: I'm an old Richard Wilbur/Anthony Hecht fan, and have had reason now and then to regret, during my quarter century of teaching in M.F.A. programs, the relative unfashionability of rhetorical flourish."

At the end of 2001, McHugh's sixth collection of poetry, The Father of the Predicaments, was published by the Wesleyan University Press. That same year, McHugh, with Nikolai Popov, received the first International Griffin Poetry Prize in translation for Glottal Stop: 101 Poems by Paul Celan. Her next poetry collection, Eyeshot, was published in (2003) by Wesleyan University Press, and her latest collection, Upgraded to Serious, was released in 2009 both by Copper Canyon Press in the US and by Anansi in Canada.

McHugh was a judge for the 2012 Griffin Poetry Prize.

Awards and honors
 Two grants from the National Endowment for the Arts
 Griffin Poetry Prize
 Fellowship from the Guggenheim Foundation
 Milliman Distinguished Writer-in-Residence, University of Washington
 Finalist for the National Book Award
 Finalist for the Pulitzer Prize
 Witter Bynner Fellowship
 PEN/Voelcker Award for Poetry
 O. B. Hardison, Jr. Poetry Prize
 MacArthur Fellowship

Bibliography

Poetry collections
 Dangers.  New York: Houghton Mifflin, 1977
 A World of Difference.  New York: Houghton Mifflin, 1981
 To the Quick, Middletown: Wesleyan University Press, 1987,

Editor
 The Best American Poetry 2007, Guest editor (2007)
 Ploughshares Spring 2001, Guest editor (2001)
Michigan Quarterly Review 57: 4, Guest editor (2018)

Essays
 Broken English: Poetry and Partiality, University Press of New England, 1993, ; Wesleyan University Press, 2011,

Translations
 D'Apres Tout—Poems by Jean Follain. Princeton: Princeton University Press, 1981,  
 Because the Sea is Black: Poems by Blaga Dimitrova, Translators: McHugh and Nikolai Popov, Middletown: Wesleyan University Press, 1989,

References

External links
 Heather McHugh at poets.org
 Heather McHugh at Seattle Arts and Lectures
 Heather McHugh at Ink Node
 Griffin Poetry Prize biography
 Griffin Poetry Prize reading, including video clip
 Audio of Heather McHugh's lecture "In Ten Senses: Some Sentences About Art's Senses and Intents at the Walter Chapin Simpson Center for the Humanities December 4, 2003.

Harvard University alumni
University of Washington faculty
Roberta C. Holloway Lecturer in the Practice of Poetry
1948 births
Living people
20th-century American poets
21st-century American poets
Iowa Writers' Workshop faculty
MacArthur Fellows
Writers from San Diego
People from Gloucester County, Virginia
American women poets
20th-century American women writers
21st-century American women writers
American women academics
American people of Canadian descent
Yorktown High School (Virginia) alumni